Michele Zocca, professionally known as Michelangelo, is an Italian record producer, composer and musician, best known for his frequent collaborations with Blanco.

Career  
Michelangelo was born in Cremona, Italy in 1994. A self-taught musician, he became fascinated with the drums when he was in elementary school and went on to learn multiple instruments, including the electric guitar and the bass. Among his influences, he cited the duo Battisti⁠—Mogol. He started studying music production and audio mixing as an autodidact. He first met Blanco at a studio in Milan in November 2019. After working together for a year, Blanco released his debut studio album, Blu celeste, featuring Michelangelo as the main producer.

In 2022, Michelangelo produced Mahmood and Blanco's entry for the Sanremo Music Festival 2022, "Brividi". The song ended up winning the contest and Michelangelo was subsequently awarded by the comune of Vescovato.

Selected production discography

References 

Living people
1994 births
Italian record producers
People from Cremona